Reggae Greats may refer to:

 Island Reggae Greats, a series of reggae compilation albums
 Reggae Greats (Burning Spear album), 1984
 Reggae Greats: Lee "Scratch" Perry